John Bligh may refer to:

 John Bligh, 1st Earl of Darnley (1687–1728), Irish MP for Trim and for Athboy 1713–1721
 John Bligh, 3rd Earl of Darnley (1719–1781), his son, Irish MP for Athboy 1739–1747, British MP for Maidstone
 John Bligh, 4th Earl of Darnley (1767–1831), his son, British peer and cricketer
 John Bligh, 6th Earl of Darnley (1827–1896), British peer
 John Duncan Bligh (1798–1872), his son, British envoy to Sweden and Hanover
 John Bligh (medical educator), British doctor and medical educator
 John Bligh (Royal Navy officer) (1770–1831), British naval officer 
 John O'Connell Bligh (1834–1880), Native Police officer in the British colonies of New South Wales and Queensland